Richard Aaron Katz (March 13, 1924 – November 10, 2009) was an American jazz pianist, arranger and record producer. He freelanced throughout much of his career, and worked in a number of ensembles. He co-founded Milestone Records in 1966 with Orrin Keepnews.

Career 
Katz studied at the Peabody Institute, the Manhattan School of Music, and Juilliard. He also took piano lessons from Teddy Wilson. In the 1950s, he joined the house rhythm section of the Café Bohemia, and worked in the groups of Ben Webster and Kenny Dorham, Oscar Pettiford, and, later, Carmen McRae. From 1954 to 1955, he was part of the J. J. Johnson/Kai Winding Quintet. He also worked in Orchestra USA and participated on Benny Carter's Further Definitions album, and worked on some of Helen Merrill's recordings. In the late 1960s, he played with Roy Eldridge and Lee Konitz. In the 1990s, he worked as a pianist and arranger with the American Jazz Orchestra and Loren Schoenberg's big band.

Will Friedwald called Katz "a keyboardist of uncommon sensitivity and harmonic acumen." He was the favorite pianist of Benny Carter and Coleman Hawkins, as well as vocalists Carmen McRae and Helen Merrill.

Personal life 
He died in Manhattan of lung cancer at the age of 85.

His son, Jamie Katz, a Columbia University graduate, is a freelance journalist and contributor to the Smithsonian magazine.

Discography

As leader/co-leader

As sideman
With Benny Carter
Further Definitions (Impulse!, 1961)
Central City Sketches (MusicMasters, 1987)
With Al Cohn
Four Brass One Tenor (RCA Victor, 1955)
With Jack DeJohnette
The DeJohnette Complex (Milestone, 1969)
With Kenny Dorham
Kenny Dorham And The Jazz Prophets (Chess, 1956)
With Nancy Harrow
Secrets (Soul Note, 1991)
With Milt Hinton
East Coast Jazz /5 (Rhino, 1955)
With Jimmy Knepper
Dream Dancing (Criss Cross, 1986)
With Lee Konitz
The Lee Konitz Duets (Milestone, 1967)
Peacemeal (Milestone, 1969)
Satori (Milestone, 1974)
Oleo (Sonet, 1975) 
Chicago 'n All That Jazz (Groove Merchant, 1975)
With Carmen McRae
Something to Swing About (Kapp, 1959)
With Helen Merrill
"The feeling is mutual" 1965
Chasin' The Bird (Emarcy, 1979)
With James Moody
The Blues and Other Colors (Milestone, 1969)
With Joe Newman
I'm Still Swinging (RCA Victor, 1955)
With Oscar Pettiford
The Oscar Pettiford Orchestra in Hi-Fi Volume Two (ABC-Paramount, 1957)
With Jimmy Raney
Jimmy Raney featuring Bob Brookmeyer (ABC-Paramount) with Bob Brookmeyer
With Sonny Rollins
Sonny Rollins and the Big Brass (Metrojazz, 1957)
With Loren Schoenberg
’’That’s The Way It Goes’’ (Aviva, 1984)
’’Time Waits For No One’’ (Music Masters 1987)
’’Solid Ground’’(Music Masters 1988)
’’Just A Settin’ And A-Rockin’ ‘’(Music Masters 1989)
Manhattan Work Song (Music Masters 1992)
Out Of This World (TBC; 1997)
With Ben Webster
Big Ben Time! (Philips, 1963)
'With Kai Winding and J. J. JohnsonKai and Jay and Bennie Green with Strings (OJC, 1952–54)K + J.J. (Bethlehem, 1955)Dave Brubeck and Jay & Kai at Newport (Columbia, 1956)Jay and Kai'' (Columbia, 1957)

References 

1924 births
2009 deaths
American music arrangers
American jazz composers
American male jazz composers
American jazz pianists
American male pianists
Manhattan School of Music alumni
Atlantic Records artists
Milestone Records artists
20th-century American pianists
20th-century American composers
20th-century American male musicians
American Jazz Orchestra members
Reservoir Records artists
20th-century jazz composers
Juilliard School alumni
Peabody Institute alumni